Rear Admiral Alexander Michael Gregory,  (born 15 December 1945) is a former Royal Navy officer who served as Flag Officer Scotland, Northern England and Northern Ireland from 1997 to 2000.

Naval career
Gregory joined the Royal Navy in 1964. After commanding three submarines, he became captain of the frigate, in 1988. Following a tour as Assistant Director of Naval Staff Duties in the Ministry of Defence, he was made naval attaché in Washington D. C. in 1994 and Flag Officer, Scotland, Northern England and Northern Ireland in 1997, before retiring in 2000.

Post-service career
In retirement Gregory was made chief executive of the Mechanical and Metal Trades Confederation and then Chief Executive of the Energy Industries Council. He also became Lord Lieutenant of Dunbartonshire.

Gregory was appointed Commander of the Royal Victorian Order (CVO) in the 2020 Birthday Honours.

References

|-

1945 births
Living people
People educated at Marlborough College
Royal Navy rear admirals
Commanders of the Royal Victorian Order
Officers of the Order of the British Empire
Lord-Lieutenants of Dunbartonshire